Turkey is primarily a country of two peninsulas: the Asiatic (southeastern) side is Anatolia, and the European (northwestern) side is Thrace on the Balkan Peninsula. On these two main peninsulas there are secondary peninsulas.

The list of peninsulas

See also 
Bays of Turkey
Capes of Turkey
Geography of Turkey

References 

Peninsulas

Turkey